Howard Lee Bickley (May 3, 1871 – March 4, 1947) was an American lawyer and judge.  Originally from Missouri, he relocated to New Mexico and became chief justice of the New Mexico Supreme Court.

Life and career 
Bickley was born in Mexico, Missouri.  He graduated from the University of Missouri School of Law in 1895, and then returned to Mexico to practice law.  He was elected prosecuting attorney for Audrain County on the Democratic ticket.  He moved to Raton, New Mexico in 1904, and practiced law there until he became a judge.

He was elected to the New Mexico Supreme Court as a Democrat, and began his service January 1, 1925.  He was re-elected in 1932 and 1940.  He served as chief justice three times during his tenure, the last time from January 1, 1947 until his death. He administered the oath of office to four governors.

In both 1930 when Edward Terry Sanford died, and in 1932 when Oliver Wendell Holmes Jr. retired from the Supreme Court of the United States, Bickley was on President Herbert Hoover’s list of possible replacements, although the seats ultimately went to Owen J. Roberts and Benjamin N. Cardozo.

Bickley died of a sudden heart attack in his home in Santa Fe the night of March 4, 1947. A freemason, his funeral services were conducted on March 6 at the Scottish Rite Cathedral in Santa Fe.  State offices were closed the same day for an hour and a half in his memory. He was buried in Fairmont Cemetery in Raton, next to his wife.

Personal life 
He married Ruth K. Phillips in 1897 in Mexico, Missouri; Ruth died in 1910 and he did not remarry.  They had one daughter, Frances.

References

1871 births
1947 deaths
Chief Justices of the New Mexico Supreme Court
Justices of the New Mexico Supreme Court
Missouri Democrats
Missouri lawyers
New Mexico Democrats
New Mexico lawyers
People from Mexico, Missouri
People from Raton, New Mexico
University of Missouri alumni